The National Health Insurance Scheme (NHIS) was established by the government of Ghana in 2003. The program was a form of national health insurance established to provide equitable access and financial coverage for basic health care services to Ghanaian citizens. Ghana's universal healthcare system has been described as the most successful healthcare system on the African continent by business magnate Bill Gates. The system has been found to have made Ghana's rate of health insurance one of the highest in Africa, though funding problems may complicate its future.

Birth of Ghana's National Health Insurance Scheme
The National Health Insurance Scheme is a form of social intervention established by the Government of Ghana in the year 2003. The scheme provides equitable access and financial coverage for basic health care services to residents in Ghana. The objective of the NHIS is to secure the implementation of the national health insurance policy that ensures access to basic healthcare services to all residents of Ghana.

Premiums
Like all insurance schemes, different types of premiums are available under the country's NHIS. Ghanaian contributors are grouped according to their levels of income. Based on the group a Ghanaian contributor may fall in, there is specific premium that ought to be paid.

Controversies
Since the inception of the scheme in 2003, there have been a lot of controversies surrounding its operation and purpose. The first one was to do with members of the opposition National Democratic Congress (NDC), whose members claimed that the scheme was one made for members of the then ruling New Patriotic Party (NPP). As such many members of NDC did not want to register with the scheme. The reverse of all the propaganda that surrounded the scheme at its inception were revisited in 2009 when the NDC took over power.
The NDC during its campaign leading to the 2008 general elections promised to make the payment of premiums under the scheme a one-time event. This idea was included in the NDC's manifesto. The promise has so far not come into fruition as the date for its implementation is constantly postponed. Many critics of the proposal claim that it is just not possible to support the scheme with a one-time premium since the sustainability of the scheme would not be possible if premiums were not paid yearly. The promise could however not be implemented during the 8 year reign of the NDC.

Linking of NHIS card to Ghana Card 
In November 2020, a short code was introduced to facilitate the integration of the National Health Insurance card and the Ghana Card. This was in line with the drive to make the Ghana Card the sole means of gaining access to public services.

See also
 Health in Ghana
 National health insurance
 Universal health coverage

References

External links
 National Health Insurance Scheme
 https://helpinghana.com/index.php/2018/01/28/list-best-dental-clinics-ghana/

Presidency of John Kufuor
Medical and health organisations based in Ghana
Ghana